Peter Alan Keen (born 16 November 1976) is an English professional football goalkeeper.

Keen was born in Middlesbrough and began his career as a trainee with Newcastle United, turning professional in August 1995.

He joined Carlisle United on a free transfer in June 1999.

He let in five goals on his Carlisle debut, a 5–2 defeat away to Halifax Town and did not play again until the following February when he let in another four goals away to Rotherham United. On 24 October 2000, Keen scored for Carlisle with a kick from his own penalty area in the 3–2 defeat away to Blackpool.

He joined Darlington on loan in March 2001, before returning to the reserves at Carlisle. He finally gained a regular place in the Carlisle side during the 2001–02 season, but was released at the end of the season as Carlisle sought to cut costs. However, he re-signed for the club before the start of the next season but after then was ousted as first-choice keeper by Matt Glennon.

Carlisle were relegated to the Conference in 2004, but Keen remained with the Cumbrians until September that year when he joined fellow Conference side Scarborough on a free transfer, playing just four times before suffering a serious shoulder injury.

He left Scarborough at the end of the 2004–05 season and was a regular in the Gateshead side during the 2005–06 season, but left to join Horden Colliery Welfare at the end of the season. In February 2007 he rejoined Gateshead. Keen joined Billingham Synthonia before the start of the 2008–09 season.

References

External links

Billingham Synthonia profile

1976 births
Living people
Footballers from Middlesbrough
English footballers
Association football goalkeepers
Newcastle United F.C. players
Carlisle United F.C. players
Darlington F.C. players
Scarborough F.C. players
Gateshead F.C. players
Darlington Town F.C. players
Billingham Synthonia F.C. players
English Football League players
National League (English football) players
Northern Premier League players
Northern Football League players